Ammuvinte Amma (ml;അമ്മുവിൻ്റെ അമ്മ) (English:Mother of Ammu)  is an  Indian Malayalam television serial that  began on Mazhavil Manorama from 27 March 2017.
The series replaced the serial Manjurukum Kaalam. The series went off-air on 13 July 2018 completing 357 episodes.

Plot 

Anupama lives with her mother and sister ammu who is in 1st standard 

A boy falls in love with her who works with her in office later revealed that ammu is anu 's daughter and she is already married to her maths tutor, Kiran who had a mental disorder. He made anu work so much and punished her for silly things .

One day anu goes to her home. Kiran comes there and takes her with force 

While driving with her fast due to anger with her accident happens and anu loses her memory and Kiran goes missing. Later anu becomes pregnant and as anu don't know anything anu's mom tells ammu is her daughter and anu becomes her sister later it is revealed that Kiran's aunt who looked him after his parents death gave him medicine to make him mad so that she will get his wealth

Cast
Main cast
Vinaya Prasad as Padmaja a.k.a. Pappa
Malavika Wales as Anupama a.k.a. Anu, Kiran's wife
Srinish Aravind  as Manoj a.k.a. Manu
 Subash Balakrishnan as Kiran, Anu's husband
Baby Keshiya as Ammu
Preetha Pradeep as Sumi
Supporting Cast
Kishore as Ramachandran
Balachandran Chullikkadu as Gopi mash
Rajani Murali as Vijaya ;Gopi mash's wife
Payyanur Murali as Sethu
Varsha as Seetha
Arya parvathy as Supriya, Manu's sister
Ambareesh as Jayanthan
Rishi  as Vyshakhan
Aishwarya  as Lakshmi 
Shantakumari as Margret  
Neelambari Menon as Raginiyamma 
Jolly Esow
Anzil Rehaman
 Earlier Cast
Sajesh Nambiar as Manu
Anila Sreekumar as Seetha
K.P.S.C.Saji as Sethu
Anu as supriya

Development
On 3 March 2017, first promo of the show 'Festival' was released by Mazhavil Manorama on YouTube.
On 11 March 2017 second promo of the show 'beside the beach' was released by Mazhavil Manorama.
South Indian actress Vinaya Prasad is making her comeback to Malayalam television industry after a hiatus of 3 years through this serial. Malavika Wales who is known for Ponnambili plays the lead role. Subhash Balakrishnan is the male lead

References

2017 Indian television series debuts
Malayalam-language television shows
Mazhavil Manorama original programming